Henry Lawrence (1600–1664) was an English Puritan statesman. He graduated from Emmanuel College, Cambridge with an M.A. in 1627. He was commissioner of plantations in 1648, and a commissioner for Ireland in 1652. He served as an M.P. Hertfordshire and Carnarvonshire. He was appointed Keeper of the Library at St. James's House, in 1653. He was Lord President of the Council of State from 1654 until 1659. He also published three pamphlets between 1646 and 1649 on the doctrine of baptism.

Biography
Lawrence, born in 1600, was the eldest son of Sir John Lawrence, (died 1604), of St. Ives, Huntingdonshire, by his marriage, on 7 March 1599, with Elizabeth, only daughter and heiress of Ralph Waller of Clerkenwell, Middlesex, fourth son of Robert Waller of Beaconsfield, Buckinghamshire. He entered Gray's Inn in 1617, before continuing his education at Queens' College, Cambridge and then Emmanuel College, Cambridge, where he became an MA in 1627.

At college he belonged to the puritan party. He was not only lineally allied to Oliver Cromwell, but was at one time his landlord, as he let to him his house and farm at St. Ives from 1631 to 1636. About 1638 he retired to Holland, probably to avoid the severity of the ecclesiastical courts. He returned in 1641, but was abroad again at the outbreak of the English Civil War. In December 1645 he was at Arnheim in Guelderland, and at Altena in January 1646.

On his final return to England he replaced one of the "disabled" members for the constituency of Westmorland on 1 January 1646. In July 1646 he was nominated one of the commissioners for the preservation of peace between England and Scotland, and on 17 March 1648 he became a commissioner of plantations.

Greatly to Cromwell's annoyance, in 1649 Lawrence expressed strong disapproval of the trial and execution of King Charles I. In 1652, being then styled "colonel" he visited Ireland as a commissioner for that kingdom.

On 14 July 1653 he was appointed one of the Council of State, and placed on several committees. In the Barebones Parliament of 1653 Lawrence sat for Hertfordshire, and after its dissolution was placed on Cromwell's new Council of State, his salary being £1,000 a year. In November 1653 the Council of State appointed him Keeper of the Library at St. James's House. At the second meeting of the Council he was made president (chairman) for a month, but by a subsequent order of Cromwell, dated 16 December 1653, he became permanent chairman, with the title of "Lord President of the Council". In the satirical Narrative of the Late Parliament (1658), Lawrence is said to have been made president to win over, or at least keep quiet, "the baptised people, himself being under that ordinance". John Milton, however, in his second Defensio Populi Anglicani (1653–1654), bears eloquent testimony to Lawrence's ability and learning. In 1654 Lawrence strove to assist Lord Craven in recovering his English estates, which had been confiscated in 1650–1651, and he had some correspondence with Elizabeth, Queen of Bohemia, on the subject.

In the First Protectorate Parliament of 1654 Lawrence was again returned for Hertfordshire, and the Second Protectorate Parliament of 1656 he was chosen for both Colchester and Carnarvonshire. He elected to serve for Carnarvonshire, and continued to represent it until his elevation to Cromwell's Other House in December 1657. On the death of Cromwell in September 1658 he declared Richard Cromwell his successor as Protector and ordered his proclamation. He ceased to act as president in July 1659.

After the restoration of the monarchy Lawrence withdrew to Thele, otherwise Goldingtons, a manor in the parish of Stanstead St Margarets, Hertfordshire, which he inherited on the death of his son Edward in 1657. There he died on 8 August 1664, and was buried in the church.

Family
On 21 October 1628 Lawrence married, Amy, daughter of Sir Edward Peyton, of Iselham, Cambridgeshire. They had seven sons and six daughters. His wife's extraordinary piety proved a fertile source of cavalier satire. To their eldest son (Edward or Henry) Milton addressed in the winter of 1656 his twentieth sonnet,  "Lawrence! of virtuous father virtuous son". Their younger son John emigrated first to Barbados, then Jamaica where he founded a wealthy dynasty of plantation owners.

Works
Lawrence was author of:
 Of Baptisms [anon.], 8vo [Rotterdam], 1646; another edition entitled A Pious and Learned Treatise of Baptism, 4to, London, 1649.
 Of our Communion and Warre with Angels: being certain Meditations on that subject, bottom'd particularly on Ephes. vi. 12 ... to the 19, 4to [Amsterdam], 1646; another edition, bearing a different imprint, was issued during the same year. The treatise is commended by Isaac Ambrose in the sixth section of the prolegomena to his Ministration of, and Communion with, Angels, first published about 1660, and also by Richard Baxter, in his Saints' Rest, 12th edit. p. 238. 
 Some Considerations tending to the Asserting and Vindicating of the Use of the Holy Scriptures and Christian Ordinances; . . . wherein . . . the Ordinance of Baptisme . . .is manifested to be of Gospell-Institution, and by Divine appointment to continue still of Use in the Church, 4to, London, 1649; another edition, with different title-page, A Plea for the Use of Gospel Ordinances, 1652. This work, together with the Communion and Warre, is dedicated to the author's mother, who would seem to have suggested its preparation. It is principally a reply to William Dell's Doctrine of Baptismes.

Notes

References
 Endnotes
Gent. Mag. 1815, pt. ii. pp. 14–17; 
Notes and Queries, 2nd ser. xii. 177, 3rd ser. vii. 377, viii. 98, 289, 5th ser. xi. 601–3, xii. 212, 6th ser. ii. 155, 174, 298, xi. 208;
Cal. State Papers, Dom. 1652–9; Waters's Chesters of Chicheley, i. v;
Cussans's Hertfordshire, "Hundred of Hertford", p. 136;
Clutterbuck's Hertfordshire, ii. 211, 213;
Bishop John Wilkins's Eeclesiastes, 4th ed. p. 81;
Masson's Life of Milton, iii. 402;
Lodge's Peerage of Ireland, ed. Archdall, under "Barrymore".

Further reading
D Brunton & D H Pennington, Members of the Long Parliament (London: George Allen & Unwin, 1954)
Cobbett's Parliamentary history of England, from the Norman Conquest in 1066 to the year 1803 (London: Thomas Hansard, 1808) 

1600 births
1664 deaths
Alumni of Emmanuel College, Cambridge
Alumni of Queens' College, Cambridge
English landowners
17th-century English Puritans
17th-century English politicians
English MPs 1640–1648
English MPs 1653 (Barebones)
English MPs 1654–1655
English MPs 1656–1658
Members of the Parliament of England (pre-1707) for constituencies in Wales
Members of the Parliament of England for Hertfordshire